Izzet Pasha may refer to:
 Izzet Mehmed Pasha (1723–1784), Ottoman grand vizier (1774–75, 1781–82) and governor of Egypt (1775–78)
 Safranbolulu Izzet Mehmet Pasha (1743–1812), Ottoman grand vizier (1794–98) and governor of Egypt (1791–94)
 Topal Izzet Mehmed Pasha (1792–1855), Ottoman grand vizier (1828–29, 1841–42)
 Izzet Ahmed Pasha (1798–1876), Ottoman governor of various provinces
 Ahmad Izzat Pasha al-Abid (1851-1924), Ottoman Syrian bureaucrat and spymaster to Abdul Hamid II, known as 'Izzat Pasha the Arab' (Arap İzzet Paşa)
 Ahmed Izzet Pasha (1864–1937), Ottoman general and grand vizier (1918)
 Hasan Izzet Pasha (1871–1933), Ottoman general
 Yusuf Izzet Pasha (1876–1922), Ottoman general

See also
 Izzet, a name
 Pasha, a title